Guff  is a village and a union council of Kallar Syedan Tehsil in Rawalpindi District Punjab, Pakistan. Guff Coms under Kallar Syedan Circle Union Councils Guff was under NA-50, National Assembly and PP-2, Punjab Assembly. After (Delimitation 2018) Guff came under NA-58, National Assembly and PP-7, Punjab Assembly.

Language
 Pothwari language: 90%
 Urdu 5%
 Pashto 3%
 Other 2%

Schools in Guff 
 Government Girls Primary School GUFF SINGAL, GUFF, KALLAR SYEDAN

References 

Union councils of Kallar Syedan Tehsil
Populated places in Kallar Syedan Tehsil
Villages in Kallar Syedan Tehsil